is an adventure game developed by Grasshopper Manufacture. Acting as a sequel to the company's debut title The Silver Case, it was first released for mobile devices in October 2005, remained in service through different providers until May 2011. The original version's gameplay focuses on solving puzzles using number inputs. The story, set seven years after The Silver Case, follows a new group of characters in the 25th Ward district solving a series of murders.

The 25th Ward was created by Goichi Suda as part of a collaboration with Genki. As he wanted to quickly create a sequel to The Silver Case and wanted to take a different stylistic direction, the proposed mobile platforms suited him. Suda returned along with original scenario writers Masahi Ooka and Sako Kato to write the scenarios. Takashi Miyamoto and Masafumi Takada also returned as character designer and composer respectively. The remake began development following the success of the 2016 high-definition remaster of The Silver Case. Due to the original's origins as a mobile game, Suda decided to completely remake the game instead of just remastering it.

Gameplay
The 25th Ward: The Silver Case is an adventure game in which players take on the role of different characters while navigating three scenarios. In the original mobile game, players read through story segments before issuing commands that advance the story. The original version released for mobiles used number inputs.

Synopsis
The story is set six years after its predecessor The Silver Case. The scenario was divided into three parts: "Correctness", "Matchmaker" and "Placebo". Each scenario was further divided into five episodes. Set within the newly-created 25th Ward district, "Correctness" follows Mokutaro Shiroyabu and Shinko Kuroyanagi investigating bizarre and violent murders; "Matchmaker" traces the exploits of Regional Adjustment Division officer Shinkai Tsuki during his interaction with the underworld of the 25th Ward; while "Placebo" follows Tokio Morishima, a returning character from the original game, investigating events in the 25th Ward guided by a mysterious "Goddess". As the story progresses, the first game's central figure Kamui Uehara reappears, drawing together the three narratives.

Development

The 25th Ward was created by Goichi Suda, founder of developer Grasshopper Manufacture and creator of the company's debut title, The Silver Case. While there was an idea to develop The 25th Ward for the PlayStation 2, the game ended up being developed on mobile platforms as Suda wanted to complete the project quickly. The project, a collaboration with Genki, took the form of a sequel to The Silver Case as there was a lot of demand for a return to the game's world and characters. Suda also wanted to write a long story. Suda created the game so that it would be accessible for both newcomers and fans of the original game, in addition to providing more game-based content for mobiles. Character designs and artwork were created by Takashi Miyamoto, while the music was composed by Masafumi Takada. The game used a monochromatic art style, both due to the mobile platform's hardware limitations, and Suda's desire to go in a different artistic direction from the original game. Suda wrote the "Correctness" scenario, the "Match Maker" scenario was written by Masahiro Yuki, while the "Placebo" scenario was written by Masahi Ooka. Both Suda and Ooka had previously worked on the scenario for The Silver Case. The original game used a two-storyline structure, with an additional storyline being added when Yuki suggested another storyline of his creation. Its title was taken from the professional wrestling term "matchmaking". The storylines were written simultaneously due to episode delivery deadlines. The original scenarios were spread across five episodes; a sixth episode was planned but never materialized.

The 25th Ward was first announced at the 2005 Tokyo Game Show. The game began distribution through Genki's mobile portal on 3 October 2005 for DoCoMO, EZweb, and Vodafone. Episodes were released sporadically over the next year, with updates for newer mobile phone models. The final episode of the original version, the fourth episode of the "Placebo" scenario, released on 3 July 2006. During the mobile version's lifespan, an original scenario dubbed "Transmitter Digital Man" was released on 1 June 2006, featuring the original game's protagonist Sumio Kodai. Distribution of the original version ended on 28 February 2007 due to license agreement changes between Genki and its mobile partners. The game resumed distribution through Liveware on 17 December 2007 for DoCoMo and Yahoo! devices after a prolonged hiatus. In addition to the original four episodes, a new episode for each story was written, with the episodes releasing on 30 April 2008. A version with enhanced graphics was released on 13 March 2009. The second mobile version of The 25th Ward shut down in May 2011.

A version of The 25th Ward for the Nintendo DS was originally planned by Suda, to be released with the planned DS port of the original game. The existence of The 25th Ward meant that no new content was created for the DS port of The Silver Case. In a later interview, Suda referred to The 25th Ward as a "ghost" game due to its status as a mobile title that was no longer available for download. The Silver Case was re-released as a high-definition remaster in 2016, with Suda commenting that it if sold well he would consider remaking The 25th Ward. A remake was announced in July 2017. Due to the game's age and initial platform, Suda decided upon a complete remake rather than a remaster. A worldwide release for PlayStation 4 and Windows was announced on 21 September 2017 and subsequently released on 15 March 2018. The PlayStation 4 version was packaged with its predecessor in Japan under the title The Silver Case 2425. A port of The Silver Case 2425 for the Nintendo Switch was announced on 7 November 2020 for a Japanese release on 18 February  2021. It was announced on 4 March 2021 that The Silver Case 2425 for the Nintendo Switch would be available on 6 July 2021 in North America and 9 July 2021 in Europe.

Reception

Notes

References

External links
  (archived December 2005) 

2005 video games
Adventure games
Cancelled Nintendo DS games
Fiction about murder
Grasshopper Manufacture games
Linux games
MacOS games
Mobile games
Monochrome video games
Nintendo Switch games
PlayStation 4 games
PlayStation Network games
Single-player video games
Video game remakes
Video game sequels
Video games about police officers
Video games developed in Japan
Video games directed by Goichi Suda
Video games scored by Akira Yamaoka
Video games scored by Masafumi Takada
Video games with alternative versions
Windows games
Playism games